The 2011 European Amateur Team Championship took place 5–9 July at Oceânico Golf in Vilamoura, Algarve, Portugal on its Victoria Course. It was the 29th men's golf European Amateur Team Championship.

Venue 

The course was designed by Arnold Palmer and opened in 2004. In 2016, Dom Pedro Golf acquired the Victoria Course and four other Vilamoura courses from Oceânico Golf.

Format 
Each team consisted of 6 players, playing two rounds of stroke-play over two days, counting the five best scores each day for each team.

The eight best teams formed flight A, in knock-out match-play over the next three days. The teams were seeded based on their positions after the stroke play. The first placed team was drawn to play the quarter final against the eight placed team, the second against the seventh, the third against the sixth and the fourth against the fifth. Teams were allowed to use six players during the team matches, selecting four of them in the two morning foursome games and five players in to the afternoon single games. Teams knocked out after the quarter finals were allowed to play one foursome game and four single games in each of their remaining matches. Games all square at the 18th hole were declared halved, if the team match was already decided.

The eight teams placed 9–16 in the qualification stroke-play formed flight B, to play similar knock-out play, with one foursome game and four single games in each match, to decide their final positions.

The four teams placed 17–20 formed flight C, to play each other in a round-robin system, with one foursome game and four single games in each match, to decide their final positions.

Teams 
20 nation teams contested the event, the same number of teams as at the previous event one year earlier. Russia took part for the first time. Each team consisted of six players.

Players in the leading teams

Other participating teams

Winners 
Leader of the opening 36-hole competition was team Spain, with a 24-under-par score of 696. Defending champions England did not make it to the quarter finals, finishing ninth in the qualifying round.

There was no official award for the lowest individual score, but individual leader was Scott Fernandez, Spain, with a 9-under-par score of 135, two strokes ahead of Adrián Otaegui, Spain and Thomas Pieters, Belgium.

Team France won the gold medal, earning their first title, beating team Switzerland in the final 4–2.

Team Sweden, earned the bronze on third place, after beating Germany 4–3 in the bronze match.

Results 
Qualification round

Team standings

* Note: In the event of a tie the order was determined by the best total of the two non-counting scores of the two rounds.

Individual leaders

 Note: There was no official award for the lowest individual score.

Flight A

Bracket

Final games

* Note: Game declared halved, since team match already decided.

Flight B

Bracket

Flight C

First round

Second round

Third round

Final standings

Source:

See also 
 Eisenhower Trophy – biennial world amateur team golf championship for men organized by the International Golf Federation.
 European Ladies' Team Championship – European amateur team golf championship for women organised by the European Golf Association.

References

External links 
European Golf Association: Full results

European Amateur Team Championship
Golf tournaments in Portugal
European Amateur Team Championship
European Amateur Team Championship
European Amateur Team Championship